Reuben Wood (1792/1793October 1, 1864) was a Democratic politician from the U.S. state of Ohio. He served as the 21st governor of Ohio.

Biography
Wood was born near Middletown, Rutland County, Vermont in either 1792 or 1793. While living with an uncle in Canada after his father died, Wood was conscripted into the Canadian Army at the outset of the War of 1812, but escaped across Lake Ontario and briefly served in the Vermont militia.

Career
Wood moved to Cleveland, Ohiothen a tiny village of 600 residentsin 1818 with his wife and infant daughter. He reputedly arrived with only $1.25 left to his name to work as a lawyer. He served in the Ohio State Senate from 1825 to 1830. In 1830, he was elected President Judge of the third judicial circuit. He served on the Common Pleas Court bench from 1830 to 1833.

Wood was elected in 1833 to the Ohio Supreme Court, and served two seven-year terms from 1833 to 1847. He was defeated in a bid for a third term by a Whig candidate. He took office in late 1850 as governor. His first term was cut short by the implementation of a new state constitution, and he was re-elected in late 1851, re-inaugurated in early 1852. He resigned on July 13, 1853 to take a position as the American consul in Valparaíso, Chile. He remained there until 1855, when he retired to Cleveland.

Wood married Mary Rice, of Clarendon, Vermont in 1816 or 1817. They had two daughters.

Wood was known as The tall chief of the Cuyahogas, or Cuyahoga Chief, or Old Cuyahoga Chief, or Old Chief of the Cuyahogas.

Death
Wood died at his farm, Evergreen Place, eight miles west of Cleveland, on October 1, 1864 from bilious colic. He was initially interred on the farm, and was later reburied at Woodland Cemetery in Cleveland.

References

Bibliography

External links

1793 births
1864 deaths
Democratic Party governors of Ohio
Democratic Party Ohio state senators
Justices of the Ohio Supreme Court
American militiamen in the War of 1812
Ohio state court judges
19th-century American diplomats
People from Middletown Springs, Vermont
American consuls
Burials at Woodland Cemetery (Cleveland)
19th-century American politicians
19th-century American judges